This is an incomplete list of books published in the Glagolitic script. For handwritten works see List of Glagolitic manuscripts. For inscriptions see List of Glagolitic inscriptions.

List

See also

 List of Glagolitic inscriptions
 List of Glagolitic manuscripts

References

Glagolitic script
Old Church Slavonic literature